In Meitei mythology and religion, Nongthang Leima is the goddess of seduction, thunder, and lightning. She was created by Atingkok (or Salailen) to attract Haraba (Pakhangba).
She mastered thunder and lightning in the chaos in the early world. She predicted the first rain. 
She limits the chaos and helps creation.

Etymology 

The female first name "Nongthang Leima" (ꯅꯣꯡꯊꯥꯡ ꯂꯩꯃ) is made up of two Meitei language words, "Nongthang" (ꯅꯣꯡꯊꯥꯡ, /noŋ.tʰáŋ/) and "Leima" (ꯂꯩꯃ, /lə́i.ma/). In Meitei language (Manipuri language), "Nongthang" (ꯅꯣꯡꯊꯥꯡ, /noŋ.tʰáŋ/) means lightning. The word "Nongthang" (ꯅꯣꯡꯊꯥꯡ, /noŋ.tʰáŋ/) itself is also made up of two words, "Nong" (ꯅꯣꯡ, /noŋ/) and "Thāng" (ꯊꯥꯡ, /tʰáŋ/). "Nong" (ꯅꯣꯡ, /noŋ/) means rain and "Thāng" (ꯊꯥꯡ, /tʰáŋ/) means sword.
In Meitei language (Manipuri language), "Leima" (ꯂꯩꯃ, /lə́i.ma/) means queen. The word "Leima" (ꯂꯩꯃ, /lə́i.ma/) itself is made up of two words "Lei" (ꯂꯩ, /lə́i/) and "Ma" (ꯃ, /ma/). "Lei" (ꯂꯩ, /lə́i/) means land and "Ma" (ꯃ, /ma/) means mother.

Description 
Nongthang Leima is a pre-historical maibi. She is the first goddess maibi to compose a dance form. Later, her dance form was repossessed by other goddesses.

Mythology

Birth 
Sanamahi (Ashiba) was creating the earth. But he was frequently disturbed by his younger brother, Pakhangba (Haraba). Unable to do any work, Sanamahi complained about the matter to their father, Salailen (or Atingkok according to different versions of stories). Salailen produced a divine feminine being. He released her into the great space (void) of the universe (cosmos). In the vast emptiness of the great space (void), the divine feminine being became a beautiful and radiant goddess. She was named "Nongthang Leima", the Queen of Lightning.

In another version of the story, Sidaba ordered Sidabi to produce "Nongthang Leima", the divine female being to lure the destroyer from the cosmic creation.

Seduction (attraction) 
Nongthang Leima, the Queen of Lightning, filled the empty space (void) with bright light. Seeing her, Pakhangba (Haraba) fell in love with her. He forgot about bothering his elder brother in the creation of the earth. Haraba came to her in the great space. During that time, Sanamahi (Ashiba) completed his creation of the earth.

Family 
When Ashiba (Sanamahi) saw Nongthang Leima, he wanted to marry her. Thus, they united. 
So, Nongthang Leima was the wife of both Sanamahi (Ashiba) and Pakhangba (Haraba).
Nongthang Leima is also known as Langmai Sana Chingjaroibi. With the union of Chingjaroibi and Sanamahi, a son named Laisang Khekwaiba was born.

Two divine forms 
According to "Politics, society, and cosmology in India's North East" written by N. Vijaylakshmi, the goddess Nongthang Leima (Nongthang Lairembi) took two divine forms after the completion of the creation of the earth. One form is Panthoibi. This form lives in the home of gods. Another form is "Apanthoibi". This form lives among the living beings.

Music 

Among the nine forms of musical rhythms (Seisaks) of Pena (musical instrument), Nongthang Leima Seisak is one. All these rhythms are categorised into three movements, slow rhythm, medium rhythm and fast rhythm. Nongthang Leima song belongs to the fast rhythm.

Festival 
During the Lai Haraoba festival, devotees dance to please various deities. Among them, male dancers act after the styles of Haraba (alias Pakhangba) and female dancers act after the styles of goddess Nongthang Leima. Goddess Nongthang Leima represents the lightning.

Identification with other deities  
Goddess Nongthang Leima is often identified as Leimarel Sidabi. The former is considered as an incarnation of the latter.

References

External links 

 E-PAO, Nongthang Leima
 INTERNET ARCHIVE, Nongthang Leima

Beauty goddesses
Dance goddesses
Fertility goddesses
Leima
Light goddesses
Love and lust goddesses
Magic goddesses
Meitei deities
Music and singing goddesses
Names of God in Sanamahism
Nature goddesses
Peace goddesses
Savior goddesses
Sky and weather goddesses
Thunder goddesses
Trickster goddesses